Parliamentary elections were held in Cameroon on 10 April 1960. They were the first elections held in accordance with the new constitution, approved in a referendum in February, which created a unicameral federal National Assembly. The result was a slim victory for the Cameroonian Union, forcing it to govern in coalition. However, the election was marred by severe irregularities. Voter turnout was 69.5%.

Results
Julienne Keutcha was the only woman elected, becoming the first directly-elected female member of the Cameroonian parliament.

References

Cameroon
1960 in Cameroon
Elections in Cameroon
Election and referendum articles with incomplete results